The Highland Park Plaza Historic District is a national historic district located at Highland Park, Richmond, Virginia. The district encompasses 1,005 contributing buildings located north of downtown Richmond and east of Barton Heights and Brookland Park.  The primarily residential area developed starting in the late-19th century as one of the city's early "streetcar suburbs." The buildings are in a variety of popular late-19th and early-20th century architectural styles including Queen Anne, American Foursquare, Colonial Revival, Tudor Revival, and bungalow.  Notable buildings include the Charles T. Culpepper House (c. 1900), Napoleon B. Palmieri House, Dr. Clyde B. Reece House (c. 1910), Sta-Kleen Inn (c. 1910), Engine Company No. 15 Firehouse (c. 1915), Highland Park Plaza Park Recreation Building, Dr. Frank K. Lord House (c. 1920), Highland Park Service Station, Highland Park Methodist Church (1927), and Featherstone Filling Station.

It was added to the National Register of Historic Places in 2004.

References

Streetcar suburbs
Historic districts on the National Register of Historic Places in Virginia
Colonial Revival architecture in Virginia
Tudor Revival architecture in Virginia
Queen Anne architecture in Virginia
Buildings and structures in Richmond, Virginia
National Register of Historic Places in Richmond, Virginia